State Highway 354 (SH 354) is a state highway in the Texas Panhandle.  This route is a replacement of a portion of SH 5, which was cancelled on September 14, 1944 as it was never built. This section was bypassed, and was renumbered to keep state highway status.

Route description
SH 354 begins at an intersection with US 385 in the town of Channing.  The highway is known as 7th Street in Channing and the road extends to the west of the US 385 intersection as FM 767.  SH 354 heads to the east from this intersection through Hartley County.  It passes over into Moore County before an intersection with FM 2202.  The highway continues east to its eastern terminus at an intersection with a concurrent US 87 and US 287.  The road continues east past this intersection as FM 1913.

Major intersections

References

354
Transportation in Hartley County, Texas
Transportation in Moore County, Texas